Antena 3 is one of the three national radio channels produced by the Portuguese public broadcasting entity Rádio e Televisão de Portugal, the others being Antena 1 and Antena 2.

The channel specializes in contemporary and alternative music, focusing on showcasing new artists, and features live concerts, news and chart countdown programmes.

History
Inaugurated on 26 April 1994, Antena 3 is distinguished by its promotion of new Portuguese music. The station has discovered and promoted some of the most important contemporary Portuguese bands. In 2015, the station was rebranded as "the entrance door of pop culture in the RTP universe".
Over the years, Antena 3 has been controlled by Jorge Alexandre Lopes, Luís Montez, José Mariño, Rui Pêgo and (currently) Nuno Reis.

In December 2019, it had a weekly reach share of 5.7%.

The Team
Some of the house names are: 
Álvaro Costa (One of the Portuguese radio biggest names)
Ana Galvão 
António Freitas (Metal presenter of "Alta Tensão")
Augusto Seabra 
Catarina Limão
DJ Vibe (weekend nights DJ)
Família Fazuma (Reggae presenter "Música Enrolada")
Fernando Alvim (Presenter of "Prova Oral" )
Henrique Amaro (One of the biggest specialists in Portuguese music producer of programs like "100%" e "Portugália")
José Paulo Alcobia (Cinema critic)
Luís Oliveira
Miguel Quintão (With Álvaro Costa presents "Bons Rapazes")
Mónica Mendes (The voice of M and many TV advertisements, never showing her face)
Nuno Calado (Disciple of António Sérgio, author of "Clandestino" and "Indigente")
Nuno Reis (Author "Caixa de Ritmos")
Paulo Castelo ("the traffic boy")
Pedro Costa (author of "Coyote")
Raquel Bulha (author of "Planeta 3", "Terra à Vista", "Borda d'água" and presenter of "Hora do Sexo" with the psychologist Quintino Aires)
Ricardo Sérgio (The news men of "info-3" and summer festivals, also music critic on the newspaper diary "DN" and magazine "Op")
Rui Estêvão
Rui Miguel Abreu (author of "Nação Hip-Hop" and founder of the record label Loop Recordings)
Rui Vargas (Lux DJ, Friday nights on Antena 3)

External links
Official homepage of Antena 3 (in Portuguese)
Antena 3 Live Stream on RTP Play

See also
List of radio stations in Portugal

References

Radio stations in Portugal
Portuguese-language radio stations
Radio stations established in 1994
1994 establishments in Portugal
Rádio e Televisão de Portugal